Immortel may refer to:

Immortels, see List of members of the Académie française
Immortel (ad vitam), a 2004 English-language, French-produced science fiction film, based upon the graphic novel La Foire aux immortels (The Carnival of Immortals)
"Immortel" (song), a 2020 song by French singer Gims

See also
 Immortal (disambiguation)
 Immortality
 Immortelle (disambiguation)